In Greek mythology, Jocasta, also rendered Iocaste and also known as Epicaste, was a daughter of Menoeceus, a descendant of the Spartoi Echion, and queen consort of Thebes. She was the wife of first Laius, then of their son Oedipus, and both mother and grandmother of Antigone, Eteocles, Polynices and Ismene. She was also sister of Creon and mother-in-law of Haimon.

Life
After his abduction and rape of Chrysippus, Laius married Jocasta.  Laius received an oracle from Delphi which told him that he must not have a child with his wife, or the child would kill him and marry her; in another version, recorded by Aeschylus, Laius is warned that he can only save the city if he dies childless. One night, Laius became drunk and fathered Oedipus with Jocasta.

Jocasta handed the newborn infant over to Laius. Jocasta or Laius pierced and pinned the infant's ankles together. Laius instructed his chief shepherd, Menoetes (not to be confused with Menoetes, the underworld spirit) a slave who had been born in the palace, to expose the infant on Mount Cithaeron and leave it to die. Laius' shepherd took pity on the infant and gave him to another shepherd in the employ of King Polybus of Corinth. Childless, Polybus and his Queen, Merope (according to Sophocles, or Periboea according to Pseudo-Apollodorus), raised the infant to adulthood.

Oedipus grew up in Corinth under the assumption that he was the biological son of Polybus and his wife. Hearing rumors about his parentage, he consulted the Delphic Oracle. Oedipus was informed by the Oracle that he was fated to kill his father and to marry his mother. Fearing for the safety of the only parents known to him, Oedipus fled from Corinth before he could commit these sins. During his travels, Oedipus encountered Laius on a narrow pass at Phocis. After a heated argument regarding right-of-way, Oedipus killed Laius, unknowingly fulfilling the first half of the prophecy. Oedipus continued his journey to Thebes and discovered that the city was being terrorized by the sphinx. Oedipus solved the sphinx's riddle, and the grateful city, along with the acting regent Creon, elected Oedipus as its new king. Oedipus accepted the throne and married Laius' widowed queen Jocasta, Oedipus’ actual mother, thereby fulfilling the second half of the prophecy. Jocasta bore her son's four children: two girls, Antigone and Ismene, and two boys, Eteocles and Polynices.

Differing versions exist concerning the latter part of Jocasta's life. In the version of Sophocles, when his city was struck by a plague, Oedipus learned that it was divine punishment for his patricide and incest. Hearing this news, Jocasta hanged herself. But in the version told by Euripides, Jocasta endured the burden of disgrace and continued to live in Thebes, only committing suicide after her sons killed one another in a fight for the crown. In both traditions, Oedipus gouges out his eyes; Sophocles has Oedipus go into exile with his daughter Antigone, but Euripides and Statius have him residing within Thebes' walls during the war between Eteocles and Polynices.

Middle Age tradition 
She is remembered in De Mulieribus Claris, a collection of biographies of historical and mythological women by the Florentine author Giovanni Boccaccio, composed in 136162. It is notable as the first collection devoted exclusively to biographies of women in Western literature.

See also
 Oedipus Rex by Sophocles, an ancient Greek retelling of this legend as a play
Oedipus, describing the life and cultural impact of the child in this legend
 Jocasta complex, describing the usually latent sexual desire that a mother has for a son. Or, alternatively, the domineering and intense but non-incestuous love that a mother has for an intelligent son; an often absent or weak father figure may be an element of this complex.
 Oedipus complex, a Freudian theory referring to a child's unconscious sexual desire for the opposite-sex parent and hatred for the same-sex parent
 Family romance, a Freudian theory whereby the young child or adolescent fantasizes that they are really the children of parents of higher social standing than their actual parents

Notes

References 
  Greek text at same website
  Greek text at same website
  Latin text at the Perseus Digital Library

Sophocles, The Oedipus Tyrannus of Sophocles edited with introduction and notes by Sir Richard Jebb. Cambridge. Cambridge University Press. 1893. Online version at the Perseus Digital Library.
Sophocles, Sophocles. Vol 1: Oedipus the king. Oedipus at Colonus. Antigone. With an English translation by F. Storr. The Loeb classical library, 20. Francis Storr. London; New York. William Heinemann Ltd.; The Macmillan Company. 1912. Greek text available at the Perseus Digital Library.

Queens in Greek mythology
Ancient Greek queens consort
Theban characters in Greek mythology
Suicides in Greek mythology
Incest in Greek mythology